Gymnopilus unicolor is a species of mushroom in the family Hymenogastraceae.

See also

List of Gymnopilus species

External links
Gymnopilus unicolor at Index Fungorum

unicolor
Taxa named by William Alphonso Murrill